The 1943 Minnesota Golden Gophers football team represented the University of Minnesota in the 1943 Big Ten Conference football season. In their second year under head coach George Hauser, the Golden Gophers compiled a 5–4 record but were outscored by their opponents by a combined total of 184 to 170.

Fullback Bill Daley and end Herb Hein were named All-Americans by the Associated Press. Daley was also named an All-American by Collier's/Grantland Rice. Tackle Paul Mitchell was named All-Big Ten first team.

Paul Mitchell was awarded the Team MVP Award.

Total attendance for the season was 182,779, which averaged to 26,111. The season high for attendance was against Purdue.

Schedule

Game summaries

Michigan

On October 23, 1942, Minnesota played Michigan in the annual Little Brown Jug game. The Wolverines had lost nine straight games to Bernie Bierman's Minnesota teams, the last Michigan victory having been in 1932.

Michigan defeated Minnesota by a score of 49 to 6 in front of a crowd of 45,000 spectators at Michigan Stadium. The 43-point margin made it the worst defeat sustained by a Minnesota team to that point in the program's history. On the first play from scrimmage, Elroy Hirsch ran 61 yards on a reverse around right end for a touchdown. Hirsch scored a total of three touchdowns and also intercepted a Minnesota pass to stop a drive in the fourth quarter. Bill Daley, the V-12 transfer who played for Minnesota in 1942, became the first player to play for both sides in Little Brown Jug games. Prior to the game, the Chicago Daily Tribune referred to Daley as "the Gophers' war time gift to their football foes." Daley scored two touchdowns, returned a punt for 37 yards to set up Hirsch's second touchdown, and kicked two extra points. After five games, Daley was the leading rusher in college football with 620 rushing yards on 98 carries.

Minnesota's only touchdown was set up by an interception of a pass thrown by Jack Wink. The interception was returned to Michigan's 15-yard line, and Frank Loren scored the touchdown late in the second quarter. Bob Wiese blocked Minnesota's extra point kick. In the fourth quarter, Wink threw a 51-yard touchdown pass to Farnham Johnson. Bob Nussbaumer also scored a touchdown for Michigan. Merv Pregulman added four extra points. Michigan dominated the game with 230 rushing yards and 128 passing yards, while holding Minnesota to 60 rushing yards and 14 passing yards.

References

Minnesota
Minnesota Golden Gophers football seasons
Minnesota Golden Gophers football